Rashmi Verma, known professionally as Pony Verma, is an Indian dance choreographer, who began her career in the year 2000. She has also done a dance reality show, Chak Dhoom Dhoom for Colors channel. Pony Verma married actor Prakash Raj on 24 August 2010. They have one child together: a boy born in February 2016.

Filmography

References

External links
 
 Pony Verma – Bollywood’s ace choreographer
 Pony Verma Received Gr8 Women Awards 2015 in Dubai 

Living people
Indian women choreographers
Indian choreographers
1977 births